Sarah Davis (born June 23, 1992) is a Canadian women's ice hockey player that made her international debut competing for the Canadian National Women's Under-18 team at the 2010 IIHF World Women's U18 Championship. She was named to the roster of the Canada women's national ice hockey team that competed at the 2015 IIHF Women's World Championship. She is the first women's ice hockey player from Newfoundland to be selected for the national team. In addition, she is the first woman from the province to have won the Clarkson Cup, achieving the feat in 2016 with the Calgary Inferno.

Playing career

Hockey Canada
Davis was part of Canada's National Women's Under-18 Team which earned a gold medal at the 2010 IIHF World Women's U18 Championship in Chicago. As a member of the gold medal winning squad, a hockey card of her was featured in the Upper Deck 2011 World of Sports card series. In addition, she participated in the Canada Celebrates Event on June 30 in Edmonton which recognized the Canadian Olympic and World hockey champions from the 2009–10 season. She was a member of Canada’s National Women’s Development Team that won a gold medal at the 2015 Nations Cup (formerly known as the Meco Cup).

CWHL
Selected third overall by the Calgary Inferno in the 2014 CWHL Draft, Davis was named as one of the participants in the 2014 CWHL All-Star Game. She made her CWHL debut on October 18, 2014, in a road game against the Toronto Furies, logging her first career goal in a 5–4 shootout loss.

Appearing with the Calgary Inferno in the 2016 Clarkson Cup finals, she registered an assist as the Inferno emerged victorious in a convincing 8–3 final.

Career statistics

Minnesota Golden Gophers (NCAA)

Calgary Inferno (CWHL)

Awards and honours
 2014 All-WCHA Second Team

Personal life
On April 17, 2015, a street in Davis' hometown of Paradise, Newfoundland and Labrador was renamed in her honor to Sarah Davis Way.

References

External links

1992 births
Living people
Calgary Inferno players
Canadian expatriate ice hockey players in the United States
Canadian women's ice hockey forwards
Clarkson Cup champions
Ice hockey people from Newfoundland and Labrador
Minnesota Golden Gophers women's ice hockey players
People from Paradise, Newfoundland and Labrador